Marshall County is a county located on the south central border of Oklahoma. As of the 2010 census, the population was 15,840. Its county seat is Madill. The county was created at statehood in 1907 from the former Pickens County of the Chickasaw Nation. It was named to honor the maiden name of the mother of George Henshaw, a member of the 1906 Oklahoma Constitutional Convention. The county and  its cities are part of the Texoma region.

History
The area covered by Marshall County was part of the territory set aside by the U.S. government for resettlement of the Choctaw tribe and the closely related Chickasaw tribe from their lands in the southeastern United States. The Chickasaws began relocating to this area in 1837. The U.S. Army built Fort Washita in 1842 to protect the new arrivals from raids by other tribes. In 1857, the Chickasaw Nation formally separated from the Choctaw Nation.  This area became part of Pickens County in the Chickasaw Nation.

Railroads came to the present-day Marshall County in 1901, when the St. Louis, Oklahoma and Southern Railway (acquired shortly after by the St. Louis and San Francisco Railway), known as the "Frisco", constructed a north–south line. The following year, the St. Louis, San Francisco and New Orleans Railroad (formerly the Arkansas and Choctaw Railway) laid tracks from east to west through the area. This line was sold to the Frisco in 1907. The State of Oklahoma relocated part of this line in 1941 to make way for the creation of Lake Texoma.

Geography
It is the smallest county in Oklahoma by land area and the third-smallest by total area. The Red River drains the county and formed the county's southern boundary. Completion of the Denison Dam in 1942 created Lake Texoma which inundated part of Marshall County's land area and forms the current southern boundary and the eastern boundary of the county as well.

Major highways
  U.S. Highway 70
  U.S. Highway 177
  U.S. Highway 377
  State Highway 32
  State Highway 99

Adjacent counties
 Johnston County (north)
 Bryan County (east)
 Grayson County, Texas (south)
 Love County (west)
 Carter County (northwest)

National protected area
 Tishomingo National Wildlife Refuge (part)

Demographics

As of the census of 2000, there were 13,184 people, 5,371 households, and 3,802 families residing in the county.  The population density was 36 people per square mile (14/km2).  There were 8,517 housing units at an average density of 23 per square mile (9/km2).  The racial makeup of the county was 77.99% White, 1.84% Black or African American, 9.10% Native American, 0.19% Asian, 0.01% Pacific Islander, 6.17% from other races, and 4.71% from two or more races.  8.60% of the population were Hispanic or Latino of any race.

There were 5,371 households, out of which 27.30% had children under the age of 18 living with them, 58.10% were married couples living together, 8.80% had a female householder with no husband present, and 29.20% were non-families. 26.40% of all households were made up of individuals, and 14.50% had someone living alone who was 65 years of age or older.  The average household size was 2.40 and the average family size was 2.87.

In the county, the population was spread out, with 23.50% under the age of 18, 7.50% from 18 to 24, 24.10% from 25 to 44, 25.50% from 45 to 64, and 19.50% who were 65 years of age or older.  The median age was 41 years. For every 100 females there were 96.50 males.  For every 100 females age 18 and over, there were 93.60 males.

The median income for a household in the county was $26,437, and the median income for a family was $31,825. Males had a median income of $25,201 versus $19,932 for females. The per capita income for the county was $14,982.  About 13.50% of families and 17.90% of the population were below the poverty line, including 24.10% of those under age 18 and 15.30% of those age 65 or over.

Politics

Economy
During the 19th century, the county's economy was based on agriculture and ranching. Cotton and corn were the most dominant crops. By 1934, oats had become the third-largest crop. After the creation of Lake Texoma, cotton acreage had dropped to about 10 percent of its 1934 level and corn had dropped to less than 2 percent, while peanuts had become the third largest crop. By 2001, wheat had become the largest crop, followed by rye, oats and peanuts.

Oil and gas production began soon after the county was formed at statehood. Pure Oil Company built an oil camp in 1940 that had 43 houses and a 35-bed bunkhouse. Pure closed the camp in 1959, after a 1957 tornado had severely damaged it.  At the turn of the 21st century, oil production was about 10 percent of the 1975 quantity, while gas production was about 68 percent of the 1975 quantity.

Other significant business sectors are: wood products, manufacturing (especially livestock trailers) and tourism.

Communities

City
 Madill (county seat)

Towns
 Kingston
 New Woodville
 Oakland

Census-designated places
 Cumberland
 Lebanon
 Little City
 McBride

Other unincorporated places
 McMillan
 Willis

See also
 National Register of Historic Places listings in Marshall County, Oklahoma

References

 
1907 establishments in Oklahoma
Populated places established in 1907